Before is an EP by electronic producer Gold Panda, released by Gold Panda himself in September 2009. The track "Heaps" came to prominence when it was used as a beat by American rapper Curren$y for a video by Pitchfork Media leading to Curren$y exclaiming "Give me 16 beats from Gold Panda."

Track listing
 "Lonely Owl" – 4:18
 "I Suppose I Should Say 'Thanks' or Some Shit" – 3:54
 "Heaps" – 2:53
 "Bad Day Bad Loop" – 1:25
 "Triangle Cloud" – 3:17	
 "Win-san Western" – 3:09

References

2009 EPs
Electronic EPs